Nick Jonas: Live in Concert is the second headlining concert tour by American singer Nick Jonas, promoting his second studio album, Nick Jonas. The tour began on August 8, 2015, in Santo Domingo, Dominican Republic and ended on October 25, 2015, in San Francisco, California.

Background
On May 18, 2015, just one day after the 2015 Billboard Music Awards, where he performed his Double Platinum hit song "Jealous", Jonas announced a new tour across North America to support his eponymous studio album. Alongside of his headlining concert tour endeavors, Nick Jonas opened for Maroon 5's Maroon V Tour on August 15, 2015. He was scheduled to open the October dates for American singer Kelly Clarkson's upcoming Piece by Piece Tour in Canada, but the remainder of the tour was canceled when Clarkson was put on vocal rest by her doctors.

Opening acts
 Popstar The Band (San Juan)
 Bebe Rexha (North America)
 Cassio Monroe (Utica)

Set list 
This set list is representative of the performance on September 14, 2015. It is not representative of all concerts for the duration of the tour.

"Chains"
"Numb"
"Levels"
"Wilderness"
"Good Thing"
"I Want You"
"Who I Am"
"A Little Bit Longer"
"Warning"
"Push"
"Santa Barbara"
"Under You"
"Roses" 
"Can't Feel My Face 
"Teacher"
"Take Over"
"Jealous"

Tour dates

Cancelled shows

Notes

References

2015 concert tours
Nick Jonas concert tours